The Underground Resistance is the 15th studio album by Norwegian black metal band Darkthrone. It was released 25 February 2013 by Peaceville Records.

Production
The album was recorded from spring 2010 through summer 2012 at Necrohell II Studios.<ref name=peaceville1>[http://www.peaceville.com/darkthrone/theundergroundresistance/album-info.php Darkthrone - The Underground Resistance]. Peaceville.com. Retrieved 26 February 2013.</ref>

Style
On The Underground Resistance, the band largely abandoned the crust punk elements found on their previous four albums. The music on the album has been described as "classic metal" incorporating '80s speed metal, thrash metal, black metal, doom metal and "a dose of punk". PopMatters critic Dean Brown called it "a lengthy jaunt which touches upon the grandiose vocal gymnastics of King Diamond galloping upon hellbound '80s-inspired thrash metal riffs, before descending into the Crypts of Rays with a spiteful Celtic Frost groove". Kyle Ward of Sputnikmusic described it as Darkthrone's "most 'metal' album", while James Zalucky of Metal Injection wrote, "If I had to give you an example of 'true metal', it would be Darkthrone's The Underground Resistance".

Critical reception

The album received positive reviews, with reviewers noting how much "fun" Fenriz and Nocturno Culto appeared to have as they continued to pay homage to classic metal bands. Both Pitchfork and PopMatters observed that the album possessed a youthful energy that belied the age of the band members. About.com noted that the album continued to move the band away from the crust punk influence most strongly heard on The Cult Is Alive'' and towards NWOBHM and power metal as driving influences.

Track listing

Credits
Nocturno Culto – vocals, electric guitar, bass guitar
Fenriz – drums, vocals, electric guitar on track 2, bass guitar on track 4
Mastered by Jack Control at Enormous Door, USA
Cover artwork by Jim Fitzpatrick

Charts

References

External links
Darkthrone - "Leave No Cross Unturned" (edit) at SoundCloud

Darkthrone albums
2013 albums
Peaceville Records albums